Elena and the Secret of Avalor is an American prime time computer-animated musical children's fantasy television movie crossover between Sofia the First and Elena of Avalor and the backdoor pilot of the latter series. Jamie Mitchell served as director, Craig Gerber served as screenplay writer, and both served as executive producers.

It premiered on November 20, 2016, on Disney Channel and Disney Junior. The movie received a nomination at the 69th Primetime Emmy Awards for Outstanding Animated Program.

Synopsis
In Avalor, Crown Princess Elena presents the witch Shuriki's broken wand to her friend Naomi. She tells her how Princess Sofia saved her and the kingdom.

While attending school in Enchantia, Sofia sees a vision of Shuriki murdering Elena's parents, King Raul and Queen Lucia, when her amulet summons her to the castle's secret library. A book in the library turns into the wizard Alacazar, who explains how Elena originally possessed Sofia's amulet. The amulet was given to Elena on her 15th birthday and it saved her life by pulling her inside when Shuriki attacked her after murdering her parents. Alacazar, who was the royal Wizard of Avalor at the time, searched for 41 years for a special Princess who could help him free Elena, eventually turning himself into a book in the Enchantian Castle library and placing the amulet in the castle to wait for the right Princess. Sofia agrees to help him and convinces her family to spend their summer vacation in Avalor and to make a trade agreement there too.

Upon arrival, Sofia is horrified to learn they will meet Shuriki as a formality and notices the cheering crowds are unhappy. Winged jaguars known as jaquins disrupt the welcome feast and agree to help Sofia after she explains her mission. They take her to Alacazar's old house to meet his wizard grandson Mateo. He summons Alacazar's spirit guide Zuzo, who tells Sofia to get Shuriki's wand, which she swipes during a dance. Warning her siblings to hide, Sofia meets Mateo and the jaquins at the Maruvian temple. She magically transforms into a mermaid and places her amulet and Shuriki's wand on an underwater statue, releasing Elena from the amulet. Against the group's objections, Elena insists on confronting Shuriki alone with the witch's wand.

At the palace, Elena confronts Shuriki in the throne room, revealing how Shuriki usurped the throne to Sofia's family. Elena tries to blast Shuriki with her wand, but due to a guard’s interference, the spell ricochets and blasts a tapestry that reveals an enchanted painting of Elena's maternal grandparents Francisco and Luisa and her little sister Isabel. Shuriki reveals that Alcazar placed Elena's sister and grandparents inside the painting to save them and it is immune to her magic. She also explains that her Chancellor Esteban is Elena's cousin. Skylar, one of the Jaquins, rescues Elena while Shuriki throws Sofia's family into the dungeon. After regrouping at Alacazar's house, Sofia, Elena, and Mateo sneak back to the castle, recruit castle chief Armando, and free her family. Luna, another one of the Jaquins, creates a diversion and attacks Shuriki, long enough for Mateo to sneak in and free Elena's family from the painting with magic. The group escapes and rallies the citizens of Avalor against Shuriki, overpowering the guards and storming the palace. Esteban steals Shuriki's wand and gives it to Elena, who snaps it, destroying the source of her power. With her magic lost, Shuriki ages rapidly and falls from the palace bridge, but manages to survive.

Elena assumes her place as Crown Princess of Avalor and gifts her amulet to Sofia. Esteban announces her as the crown princess of the land, Sofia reports her success to Alacazar in Enchantia, who gives her a new dress. In the present, Elena and Naomi decide to lock Shuriki's broken wand pieces in the treasury.

Cast

Main characters
Ariel Winter as Princess Sofia
Aimee Carrero as Princess Elena
Jane Fonda as Shuriki

From Sofia the First
Sara Ramirez as Queen Miranda
Darcy Rose Byrnes as Amber
Tyler Merna as James
Travis Willingham as Roland II
Barbara Dirikson as Flora

From Elena of Avalor
Chris Parnell as Migs
Yvette Nicole Brown as Luna
Carlos Alazraqui as Skylar
Jenna Ortega as Princess Isabel
Emiliano Díez as Francisco
Julia Vera as Luisa
Christian Lanz as Chancellor Esteban
Jillian Rose Reed as Naomi
Joseph Haro as Mateo
Keith Ferguson as Zuzo
André Sogliuzzo as Alacazar
Joe Nunez as Armando
Ana Ortiz as Rafa

Songs 
"The Great Unknown"
"Our Mighty Jaquin Cry"
"The Spirit of Avalor"
"My Time"
"Our Time (My Time Reprise)"
"Sofia the First!" (instrumental, end credits)

References

External links 

 

2016 animated films
2010s English-language films
2010s American animated films
2016 television films
American children's animated adventure films
American children's animated fantasy films
Animated crossover films
Disney television films
Sofia the First
Disney Television Animation films
Films directed by Jamie Mitchell (director)